The Gateway of the Moon is a lost American 1928 silent film directed by John Griffith Wray and starring Dolores del Río, Walter Pidgeon and Anders Randolf.

Plot
Arthur Wyatt, an American railroad conductor, is lost in the jungle of the Amazon in South America. He is rescued by Chela, the beautiful princess of a native tribe.

Cast
Dolores del Rio as Chela (Toni)
 Walter Pidgeon as Arthur Wyatt
 Anders Randolf as George Gillespie
 Leslie Fenton as 	Jim Mortlake
 Ted McNamara as Henry Hooker
 Adolph Milar as 	Rudolf Gottman 
 Noble Johnson as Soriano
 Virginia LaFonde as Indian Child

See also
1937 Fox vault fire

References

External links

1928 films
American silent feature films
1920s English-language films
American black-and-white films
Lost American films
Fox Film films
Films directed by John Griffith Wray
1928 drama films
Silent American drama films
Films set in Bolivia
Rail transport films
Lost drama films
1928 lost films
1920s American films